Saint-Césaire Convent, at first called Saint-Jean monastery, was a nunnery in the city of Arles in the south-eastern corner of the rampart.
It was founded in 512 AD.
Its name was later changed to Abbaye Saint-Césaire in honor of its first abbess, Caesaria of Arles, and it remained until the French Revolution.
Later what remained of the buildings were used as a hospice.

History

Early Middle Ages 
The Monastery of Saint-Jean was founded on 26 August 512 by the Archbishop of Arles, Caesarius, who appointed his sister Caesaria as first abbess. 
This foundation followed a first attempt to settle outside the walls in the years 506–507 that was destroyed by Frankish and Burgundian troops during the siege of Arles in 507–508.
Around 567 a wife of Guntram, King of Burgundy, probably Marcatrude or Teutéchilde, was locked up in the convent. 

The influence of the monastery and its first abbesses allowed the Rule of Caesaria to spread widely in the kingdom of the Franks, starting with the monastery created in Poitiers by Radegund, the former wife of King Chlothar I, who stayed in Arles. and in this monastery around 568–569 under the abbatial of Sister Liliole, the third abbess, who died shortly after.
She was accompanied by  Agnes, her spiritual sister whom she chose as future abbess and Venantius Fortunatus, an Italian poet who would become her biographer. 

The Vie de Rusticule, a text dedicated to the fourth abbess of this monastery, identifies several churches inside the convent: a church dedicated to the Holy Cross then to the Archangel Saint Michael and another larger one built to receive the relics of the Holy Cross in better conditions. 
The presence of these relics in Arles is probably linked to the stay of Queen Radegonde. 
This document also mentions a Saint Peter's Basilica which still existed in the tenth century and specifies the saints who were venerated there. 
Strangely enough, they are characters of oriental origin with names not widely used in Gaul, such as the archangels Gabriel and Raphael, Saint Thomas, Saint Maurice, Saint Sebastian and Saint Pons. 
On 12 August 632, the Archbishop Theodosius of Arles took part in the funeral of this abbess considered later as a saint.

The convent seems to have ceased to exist from the 7th to the 9th century. 
Towards the end of the 860s, the Archbishop Rotland of Arles wrested authority over the monastery from Emperor Louis II.
The historian Jean-Pierre Poly, for his part, specifies and traces this property back to the year 869.
In 883, Archbishop Rostang of Arles, the successor of Rotlang, restored the tomb of Saint Caesarius there, which had been violated shortly before during the capture and looting of the city by the Saracens.
In 887, in his will, the same Rostang gave a new start to the abbey. 
Saint-Césaire had at that time three groups of estates: one near Arles, in Trébon and Gallignan, and especially in the Camargue with in particular Gimeaux, Malmissane, Notre-Dame-de-la-Mer, Ulmet, Agon, Saint-Césaire de Bozaringue, the other in the county of Vaison to the north with Nyons, Vinsobres and Visan; the last being in the county of Saint-Paul-Trois-Châteaux.
The abbey then went through a period of subjection to the archbishop and of independence.

High Middle Ages

In 972 the abbey regained its autonomy under the leadership of Abbess Ermengarde, appointed by the Archbishop Ithier of Arles. 
Twenty years later, William I of Provence returned  important estates to it. 
In 1194, Pope Celestine III placed it under his direct authority.

From the sixth to the thirteenth century, the Abbey of Saint-Jean appears as a large landowner endowed initially by Caesaria then by Rostan in their wills, and enriched by purchases as well as numerous donations. 
For example, in 972 the villa of Niomes is mentioned in a deed of donation from the churches of Saint-Vincent and Saint-Ferréol de Nions to the Saint-Césaire abbey. 
Shortly after 1060 Enaurs, widow of Hugues I of Baux, and her sons returned the Albergues they saw on the villa of Agon in the Camargue.
The abbey also has one of the three cemeteries of Alyscamps, as mentioned in an arbitration award of 1121 fixing the respective burial rights with that of Saint-Honorat.

Late Middle Ages 

In the fourteenth century, the abbey was transformed into a farmer in its Camargue estates (Agon, Granouillet); initially it practiced direct exploitation there, then in the fifteenth century, taking into account the insecurity and the increase in labor costs, the form of sharecropping or renting like the Hospitallers.

A demographic crisis was linked in large part to the epidemics of plague, which caused the loss of more than half of its population in Arles between 1320 and 1430.
It severely affected the community of nuns, who mainly originated from the Arles nobility, and whose numbers sank from 108 in 1343 to 22 in 1428.
At that time, the abbey ran up against the archbishop on several occasions and was shaken by internal conflicts linked to the personality of the nuns as well as to monastic discipline, which was slackened significantly. 
The problem still did not seem to be resolved at the end of the fifteenth century, when a nun decided to leave the monastery to join another community in Aix, because of the looseness of the abbey's mores.

Ancien Régime 

In 1559, Abbess Marguerite de Clermont asked the authorities to block the passage between the monastery and the city wall due to untimely intrusions by young people coming to cause scandals even within the confines of the convent. 
In 1628, Archbishop Mgr du Laurens visited the convent. 
His prosecutor considered it necessary to establish a prison in order to put the disobedient nuns back on the right path. 
In the mid-1630s the Archbishop of Arles Jean Jaubert de Barrault introduced the Benedictine reform of the Congregation of Saint Maur into the monastery.

After the Revolution 

Under the French Revolution the convent was closed and then sold in 1792 as national property. 
It was then largely destroyed.

In 1877 the congregation of the sisters of  moved into the convent under the leadership of Miss Berthilde Bertrand from Nancy, who financed the start of the project. 
The first two sisters, Sister Bernard and Sister Zacharie, left the mother congregation of Tarbes and arrived in Arles on Sunday, 22 October 1877. 
They established a hospice for the elderly which required major redevelopments entrusted to the Arles architect Auguste Véran. 
Inaugurated on 16 October 1898, the site became the Saint-Césaire hospice.

In 1995, the buildings were permanently abandoned.

Gallery

Abbesses 

 512–527: Caesaria, sister of Bishop Caesarius of Arles
 527–559: Caesaria II
 562–569: Liliola Local saint, feast on 6 August
 569–632: Rusticula or Marcia (551–632)
 632–?: Celsa
 6??–6??: Sainte Eulalie.
 6??–7??: Sainte Léocadie.
 7??–7??: Sainte Suzanne.
 7??–8??: Sainte Julienne.
 8??–8??: Sainte Eugènie.
 8??–9??: Sainte Victoire.
 9??–9??: Sainte Euphémie.
 9??–970: Sainte Préminole.
 972– : Ermengarde, named abbess by Archbishop Ithier of Arles
 992–993: Eloïse.
 993–997: Gillette I.
 997–10??: Adèle.
 10??–1026: Gillette II.
 1026–1059: Galburge.
 1059–11??: Anceline I.
 11??–1170: Anceline II.
 1170 c.: Jourdane.
 1176–1196 c.: Aldiarde.
 1208 c. : Audiarde
 1221 c. : Audiarda
 1233 c. : Florence
 1259 c. : Ermessinde
 1270 c. : Hermessinde
 1273 c. : Audiarda
 1296–1314 : Alasacia de Lambisco or Azalaïs de Lambesc
 1314–1317 : Rixendis de Sancto–Cannato
 1317–1319 : Rixendis de landa
 1319–1326 : Margarita de Benevento
 1326–1329 : Elixendis de Vicinis
 1329–1345 : Suriana de Arenis, d'une famille de Beaucaire
 1345–1350 : Dionisa de Ripe Digna
 1351–1366 : Guillelma de Remolonis
 1366–1385 : Jauseranda de Cadella
 1385–1391 : Maria de Crosio, of a family from Limousin; relative of Pierre de Cros, Archbishop of Arles.
 1391–1416 : Galiena de Pugeto, de Puget–Théniers; sister of Manuel de Puget, Viguier d'Arles killed by the Tuschins during the capture of Arles in July.
 1416–1433 : Dulcia Gantelme, daughter of Johan Gantelme, founder of the monastery of Notre–Dame et Saint–Honorat in Tarascon.
 1433–1468 : Esmengarda Stephani.
 1468–1501 : Catherina de Sancto Michaele
 1501–1521 : Jeanne Adhémar de La Garde
 1521–1540 : Madeleine de Grille de Robiac
 1540–1549 : Jeanne de Grille de Robiac
 1549–1549 : Jehanne Reynaude d'Alen
 1549–1569 : Marguerite de Clermont
 1569–1591 : Madeleine de Grille de Robiac
 1591–1622 : Anne d’Autric
 1622–1625 : Jeanne de Vincens de Mauléon de Causans
 1625–1631 : Marie de Vincens de Mauléon de Causans
 1631–1671 : Catherine de Grille de Robiac
 1671–1705 : Marguerite de Poilloüe de Saint–Mars
 1705–1706 : Claudine Charpin des Halles du Vernet
 1706–1708 : Angélique Roses
 1709–1754 : Marguerite Amat de Gravaison
 1754–1775 : Françoise de Viguier (1716 – 11 January 1775) ; abbess from 10 December 1754
 1775–1792 : Marguerite de Moreton de Chabrillan

Notes

Citations

Sources

External links 

 Sur le site du patrimoine
 Étude des archives du couvent Saint-Césaire d'Arles
 Sur le site de la ville d'Arles

Monasteries
Buildings and structures in Arles